Rational Rose XDE, an "eXtended Development Environment" for software developers, integrates with Microsoft Visual Studio .NET and Rational Application Developer. The Rational Software division of IBM, which previously produced Rational Rose, wrote this software.

With the Rational June 2006 Product Release, IBM withdrew the “XDE” family of products and introduced the Rational Rose family of products as replacements.

The Rational Rose family of products is a set of UML modeling tools for software design. The Unified Modeling Language (UML) is the industry-standard language for specifying, visualizing, constructing, and documenting the artifacts of software systems. It simplifies the complex process of software design, creating a "blueprint" for construction of software systems.

Rational Rose could also use source-based reverse engineering; the combination of this capability with source generation from diagrams was dubbed roundtrip engineering. A 2007 book noted that other UML tools are also capable of this, the list including Borland Together, ESS-Model, BlueJ, and Fujaba.

The Rational Rose family allows integration with legacy integrated development environments or languages. For more modern architectures Rational Software Architect and Rational Software Modeler were developed. These products were created matching and surpassing Rose XDE capabilities to include support for UML 2.x, pattern customization support, the latest programming languages and approaches to software development such as SOA and more powerful data modeling that supports entity-relationship (ER) modeling. 

A 2003 UML 2 For Dummies book wrote that Rational Rose suite was the "market (and marketing) leader".

The UML part was superseded by Rational Software Architect around 2006, with Rational Rose becoming a legacy product. , the ER modelling part (Rational Rose Data Modeler) has been superseded by another IBM product—Rational Data Architect.

 IBM still sells Rational Rose, listing Visual Studio 2005 and Windows Vista as compatible environment. (see system requirement tab)

See also 
 Imagix 4D
 Rigi
 list of UML tools

References

Further reading 
 
 

Rose XDE
Data modeling tools
UML tools